No. 35 Supplement Squadron ( or T-LLv.35, or later T-Le.Lv.35) was a training squadron of the Finnish Air Force during World War II. The unit was first subordinated the Flying Regiment 3. The unit was initially stationed in Vaasa and later in Parola.

35